The Ashgabat Flagpole is a flagpole in Ashgabat, Turkmenistan. It was erected on 29 June 2008. It was the tallest free–standing flagpole in the world until being surpassed by the  National Flagpole in Azerbaijan on 1 September 2010. The Vice-president of the Guinness Book of World Records at the time, Greig Glenday, came to Ashgabat as a witness, and handed over a certificate of the record. 

The flagpole flies a  flag of Turkemenistan which weighs . The flagpole was built by the Turkish construction company Polimeks. The ceremonial raising of the flag on 29 June 2008 was attended by members of the Turkmen government, representatives of public organisations, the media, and the people. 

Despite the flagpole's height, it is not the tallest structure in Ashgabat.

See also 
List of tallest buildings and structures in the world

References 

Tourist attractions in Ashgabat
Construction records
Cultural infrastructure completed in 2008
Flagpoles
Buildings and structures in Ashgabat